Dejan Damjanović (born 27 July 1981), also known mononymously as Dejan, is a Montenegrin professional footballer who plays as a forward for Hong Kong Premier League club Kitchee. He is regarded as one of the greatest K League players of all time.

Early life
Damjanović was born in the town of Mostar, Bosnia and Herzegovina (then part of Yugoslavia) on 27 July 1981. During the Yugoslav Wars, he moved to Serbia, initially to Pančevo, and then to Belgrade.

Club career

Early career
Damjanović made his senior debut for the third division team Sinđelić Beograd in 1998, scoring 6 goals in 21 matches in his first season. He moved to Železnik in 2000 and later also played with Sremčica, Srem, Radnički Beograd and Bežanija. He experienced all the first, second, and third division of FR Yugoslavia/Serbia and Montenegro, and also became the best player and the top goalscorer of the third division while playing for Sremčica.

FC Seoul

Damjanović signed a contract with FC Seoul on 7 December 2007. He was the second highest scorer in 2007, 2008 and 2009 K League. With 23 goals for Seoul in 2011 season, he was crowned the league's top scorer. In July 2009, he managed to score two goals against Manchester United in United's Asian tour. However, FC Seoul lost 3–2, United's goals being scored by Wayne Rooney, Federico Macheda and Dimitar Berbatov.

In January 2012, Chinese Super League club Guangzhou R&F offered $5 million to FC Seoul for Damjanović, but it was rejected by Seoul. In the first match of the 2012 K League, Damjanović was substituted out after 22 minutes against Daegu FC. It had been speculated that the FC Seoul manager, Choi Yong-soo, and Damjanović had a rift. Damjanović wanted to leave but FC Seoul would not let him. However, as time went on, FC Seoul issued an official statement by Choi saying there was no tension between the two. Damjanović scored his 100th career goal with FC Seoul from a penalty goal, along with the 101st in the same match over a 3–1 win against his former club Incheon United on 28 May 2012. On 25 July 2012, he became the top foreign goalscorer in the history of the K League by scoring his 105th goal in the match against Daejeon Citizen. The previous record holder is Saša Drakulić who made 104 goals in K League. Afterwards, he scored 31 goals in 40 appearances, thus breaking the record held by Kim Do-hoon in 2002. He finished the 2012 season with many accolades and records broken. He won the league with FC Seoul as well as becoming the Most Valuable Player, top goalscorer, and one of the Best XI. In January 2013, IFFHS ranked Damjanović seventh in the world for most goals in a top-division league during a year.

In September 2013, Damjanović scored in both of two legs of the AFC Champions League quarter finals against his former team Al-Ahli. His scoring continued against the first leg of the semi-final against Esteghlal. However, despite scoring in both legs of the 2013 AFC Champions League Final against Guangzhou Evergrande, FC Seoul lost on away goals and thus ending the competition as runners-up.

Jiangsu Sainty
In December 2013, Damjanović transferred to Chinese Super League side Jiangsu Sainty with transfer fee $4.2 million.

Beijing Guoan
On 17 July 2014, Damjanović transferred to fellow Chinese Super League side Beijing Guoan.

Return to FC Seoul
On 28 December 2015, Damjanović returned to FC Seoul, signing a two-year contract.

On 3 August 2016, Damjanović scored his 150th goal in 254th appearance in the K League, setting a record for the quickest player to reach 150 goals in the K League history.

Suwon Samsung Bluewings
On 4 January 2018, Damjanović signed for FC Seoul's biggest rivals Suwon Samsung Bluewings. He was released in December 2019.

Daegu FC
In late December 2019, Daegu FC announced the signing of Damjanović on a free transfer. On June 14, he scored his first goal since moving against FC Seoul.

Kitchee
On 9 January 2021, Kitchee announced the signing of Damjanović on a free transfer. He made his debut for Kitchee on 27 February 2021, coming off the bench in the 67th minute in a 2–1 win against Southern.

On 4 March 2021, He scored his first goal in Hong Kong in just 1 minute after being substituted. In stoppage time, he scores his second to assist the team in a 2–0 victory over Pegasus. On 23 May, Kitchee SC successfully defended their Hong Kong Premier League title after beating Eastern Long Lions 2–0, courtesy of two goals by Dejan Damjanovic at the Hong Kong Stadium.

On 24 June 2021, he scored the second goal in 2021 AFC Champions League group stage against Port F.C. and makes him joint-highest goal scorer along with Lee Dong-gook in ACL history with 37 goals. On 27 June 2021, he scored a goal against Cerezo Osaka to become the all-time ACL top scorer with 38 goals. He later scored twice from the penalty spot, one each in two matches against Guangzhou, to reach his 40th goal in the AFC Champions League.

On 1 May 2022, he scored his 42nd goal in the AFC Champions League in a 2–2 draw against Vissel Kobe in the 2022 edition, which helped Kitchee to reach the knockout stages of the competition for the first time in their history.

International career
Damjanović's first international as a Montenegrin football player was against Italy on 16 October 2008. He scored two goals in the 2010 FIFA World Cup qualifiers against Cyprus. He scored his third international goal in a 2014 FIFA World Cup qualification match against Ukraine on 16 October 2012.

On 26 March 2013, during a 2014 FIFA World Cup qualifier against England, Damjanović came on, as a substitute, for Mitar Novaković in the 46th minute. Twenty minutes later he scored his fourth international goal to end the match in a 1–1 draw.

On 6 September 2013, during a 2014 FIFA World Cup qualifier, Damjanović provided the only goal for Montenegro as they tied 1–1 with Poland in Warsaw.

On 11 October 2013, Damjanović scored the only goal for Montenegro in their 4–1 defeat to England at Wembley Stadium in the 2014 FIFA World Cup qualifiers. He has earned a total of 30 caps, scoring 8 goals. His final international was a September 2015 European Championship qualification match against Moldova.

Personal life
His daughter and son were born in South Korea.

Career statistics

Club

International
Scores and results list Montenegro's goal tally first, score column indicates score after each Damjanović goal.

Honours
Radnički Beograd
Second League of Serbia and Montenegro: 2003–04

Bežanija
Serbian First League: 2005–06

Al-Ahli
Saudi Crown Prince Cup runner-up: 2006

FC Seoul
K League 1: 2010, 2012, 2016
Korean FA Cup runner-up: 2016
Korean League Cup: 2010
AFC Champions League runner-up: 2013

Suwon Samsung Bluewings
Korean FA Cup: 2019

Kitchee
Hong Kong Premier League: 2020–21

Individual
Serbian League Belgrade Player of the Season: 2001–02
Serbian League Belgrade top goalscorer: 2001–02
K League Players' Player of the Year: 2010
Korean League Cup top goalscorer: 2010
K League 1 Best XI: 2010, 2011, 2012, 2013
K League 1 top goalscorer: 2011, 2012, 2013
K League 1 Most Valuable Player: 2012
K League FANtastic Player: 2012
AFC Champions League Dream Team: 2013
AFC Champions League All-Star Squad: 2016, 2018
Hong Kong Footballer of the Year: 2020–21
Hong Kong Premier League top goalscorer: 2020–21
Hong Kong Premier League Team of the Year: 2020–21

Records
AFC Champions League all-time top goalscorer: 42 goals

Notes

References

External links
 
 
 
 

1981 births
Living people
Sportspeople from Mostar
Association football forwards
Montenegrin footballers
Montenegro international footballers
Bosnia and Herzegovina footballers
FK Sinđelić Beograd players
FK Železnik players
FK Srem players
FK Bežanija players
FK Radnički Beograd players
Al-Ahli Saudi FC players
Incheon United FC players
FC Seoul players
Jiangsu F.C. players
Beijing Guoan F.C. players
Suwon Samsung Bluewings players
Daegu FC players
Kitchee SC players
First League of Serbia and Montenegro players
Second League of Serbia and Montenegro players
Saudi Professional League players
Serbian SuperLiga players
K League 1 players
K League 1 Most Valuable Player Award winners
Chinese Super League players
Hong Kong Premier League players
Montenegrin expatriate footballers
Expatriate footballers in Serbia
Montenegrin expatriate sportspeople in Serbia
Expatriate footballers in Saudi Arabia
Montenegrin expatriate sportspeople in Saudi Arabia
Expatriate footballers in South Korea
Montenegrin expatriate sportspeople in South Korea
Expatriate footballers in China
Montenegrin expatriate sportspeople in China
Expatriate footballers in Hong Kong
Montenegrin expatriate sportspeople in Hong Kong